Real Sociedad Gimnástica de Torrelavega is a Spanish football team based in Torrelavega, in the autonomous community of Cantabria. Founded on 28 September 1907 it is the oldest football club in the region, and currently plays in Tercera División RFEF – Group 3, holding home matches at Campos del Malecón, with a capacity of 6,007 seats.

History
Gimnasticá de Torrelavega was founded in 1907. This makes the club one of the oldest football teams in Spain, as well as the oldest professional team from Cantabria. The team played mostly friendly matches before 1925, as there were not any organized football leagues in Spain prior to that. The team first played in the regional league of Cantabria for three seasons, before being accepted into Tercera Division in 1929. Gimnastica played there for two years, before switching back to the regional league of Cantabria.

Their first touch of professional football came in 1939, when the team managed to promote to Segunda Division for the first time, after winning Tercera Division the season prior. They remained there only one season, and were relegated. Gimnastica did not return to the second tier until 1949, when they managed to finish in fifth place in the 1949-50 season. They remained there for five seasons, being relegated after the 1953-54 season.

Following their relegation, Gimnastica spent 12 seasons in Tercera, before promoting back to Segunda in 1966. Their third spell in the second division lasted two years. Following that, the team bounced between Segunda Division B, Tercera and the regional leagues. Gimnastica de Torrelavega currently plays in Tercera Division, following their immediate relegation from Segunda B at the end of the 2018-19 season.

Club background
RS Gimnástica de Torrelavega – (1907–30)
Club Deportivo Torrelavega – (1930–43)
RS Gimnástica de Torrelavega – (1943–)

Season to season

8 seasons in Segunda División
21 seasons in Segunda División B
52 seasons in Tercera División
1 season in Tercera División RFEF

Current squad

Honours
Tercera División: (12) 1933–34, 1961–62, 1964–65, 1965–66, 1989–90, 1995–96, 2005–06, 2007–08, 2008–09, 2013–14, 2016–17, 2017–18

References

External links
Official website 
Futbolme team profile 

 
Football clubs in Cantabria
Association football clubs established in 1907
1907 establishments in Spain
Organisations based in Spain with royal patronage
Segunda División clubs